The 2019 PBA season was the 44th season of the Philippine Basketball Association. The league continued to use the three-conference format, starting with the Philippine Cup. The Commissioner's Cup and the Governors' Cup are the second and third conferences in the upcoming season.

Due to the major adjustments in the league calendar, the start of the league's 44th season was set to January 13, 2019. This was the first time since 2003 that the league opened their season in January or February. The PBA Leo Awards will be held during the opening ceremonies of the 2019 season while the 2018 PBA draft is set on December 16. The schedule is also affected by the Philippine national team's participation in the 2019 FIBA Basketball World Cup and the Southeast Asian Games.

The 2019 PBA All-Star Game was played from March 29 to 31, 2019 at Calasiao, Pangasinan.

Executive board
 Commissioner: Willie Marcial 
 Chairman: Ricky Vargas (Representing TNT KaTropa)
 Vice-Chairman: Richard Bachmann (Representing Alaska Aces)
 Treasurer: Raymond T. Zorrilla (Representing Phoenix Pulse Fuel Masters)

Teams

Arenas
Like several Metro Manila-centric leagues, most games are held at arenas within Metro Manila, either the Smart Araneta Coliseum or the Mall of Asia Arena, and sometimes, in the Ynares Center in Antipolo. Games outside this area are called "out-of-town" games, and are usually played on Saturdays. Provincial arenas usually host one game, rarely two; these arenas typically host only once per season, but a league may return within a season if the turnout is satisfactory.

Typically, all playoff games are held in Metro Manila arenas, although playoff and Finals games have been seldom played in the provinces.

Main arenas

Out-of-town arenas

Highlighted are playoff games.

These games were played outside the Philippines:

Transactions

Retirement
January 4, 2019: Jett Manuel officially announced his retirement after playing one season in the league for the Barangay Ginebra San Miguel franchise.
January 8, 2019: Chris Tiu officially announced his retirement after playing six seasons in the league for the Rain or Shine Elasto Painters franchise.
April 4, 2019: Josh Urbiztondo officially announced his retirement after playing eight seasons in the league.
April 12, 2019: Rico Maierhofer officially announced his retirement after playing eight seasons in the league.
November 14, 2019: Doug Kramer officially announced his retirement after playing 12 seasons in the league.

Coaching changes

Rule changes
The PBA competition committee approved the rule changes for implementation starting in the Philippine Cup games:

Notable events
The PBA Board of Governors decided to retain Ricky Vargas of TNT KaTropa as the Board Chairman. Subsequently, Dickie Bachmann of Alaska and Raymond Zorilla of Phoenix were retained as Vice-Chairman and Treasurer respectively.

Philippine Cup
February 17: A legends game organized by the PBA Legends Foundation and Breakthrough and Milestones Productions International (UNTV) entitled PBA Legends: Return of the Rivals was held at the Smart Araneta Coliseum. Former players from the Alaska Milkmen and the San Miguel Beermen played in the first game, while former players from Purefoods Hotdogs and the Ginebra San Miguel played in the second game.
March 1: The 2019 season schedule will be modified to accommodate the preparations of the Philippine men's basketball team for the FIBA Basketball World Cup to be held in September and the Southeast Asian Games on December. The season may be extended up to January 2020.
April 9: PBA referee Guillermo "Emy" Tangkion died after collapsing during their referee's workout at the JSCGO Gymnasium. A moment of silence was observed the following day before the start of the quarterfinals match between the San Miguel Beermen and the TNT KaTropa.

Commissioner's Cup
May 16: A rule change was made to be implemented starting the Commissioner's Cup that will allow a video review if a shot was made before or after the expiration of the 24-second shotclock throughout the game. Before the rule change, a video review is only possible if the shot was made in the last two minutes of the game. The rule change was made in light of the controversial shot made by Magnolia's Rome dela Rosa during Game 7 of their best-of-seven semifinals series against Rain or Shine, at the 3:30 mark of the 4th quarter. The referees counted his three point basket even though replays showed that the ball was still in his hands when the shotclock expired.
May 19: The PBA began using the Molten BG5000 basketball as their official tournament ball. The same ball will be used during the 2019 FIBA Basketball World Cup.
June 4: Calvin Abueva of the Phoenix Pulse Fuel Masters was indefinitely suspended by PBA Commissioner Willie Marcial after he was involved in two on-court incidents during Phoenix's games against Blackwater Elite and TNT KaTropa. On May 31, Abueva was involved in a verbal altercation against Ray Parks' girlfriend Maika Rivera and did lewd gestures to her after their win against Blackwater. On June 2, he clotheslined TNT's import Terrence Jones. Abueva was also fined a total of P70,000 for both incidents.  
August 14: During the second quarter of game five of the PBA Commissioner's Cup, Arwind Santos made "monkey gestures" at the San Miguel bench addressing Jones after the latter committed a foul. Initially he refused to apologize stating "I’m going to apologize? No. It depends on him. If he was annoyed, he’s a real monkey." PBA Commissioner Willie Marcial summoned Santos the following day and was fined P200,000, 100 hours of community services. Santos will also undergo counseling on equality and racial discrimination. Santos later posted a public apology through his Twitter and Instagram accounts.

Opening ceremonies
The opening ceremonies for this season were held at the Philippine Arena in Bocaue, Bulacan on January 13, 2019. The PBA Leo Awards for the 2017-18 season were held before the opening ceremonies.

The first game of the Philippine Cup between the Barangay Ginebra San Miguel and the TNT KaTropa was played after the opening ceremonies.

Below is the list of team muses:

2019 PBA Philippine Cup
The 2019 Philippine Cup started on January 13, and ended on May 15, 2019.

Elimination round

Playoffs

Quarterfinals 

|}

|}
*Team has twice-to-beat advantage. Team #1 only has to win once, while Team #2 has to win twice.

Semifinals 

|}

Finals 

|}

 Finals MVP: June Mar Fajardo 

Best Player of the Conference: June Mar Fajardo

2019 PBA Commissioner's Cup
The 2019 Commissioner's Cup started on May 19, and ended on August 16, 2019.

Elimination round

Playoffs

Quarterfinals 

|}

|}
*Team has twice-to-beat advantage. Team 1 only has to win once, while Team 2 has to win twice.

Semifinals 

|}

Finals 

|}

 Finals MVP: Terrence Romeo 
 Best Player of the Conference: Jayson Castro 
Bobby Parks Best Import of the Conference: Terrence Jones

2019 PBA Governors' Cup
The 2019 Governors' Cup started on September 20, 2019, and ended on January 17, 2020.

Elimination round

Playoffs

Quarterfinals 

|}*Team has twice-to-beat advantage. Team 1 only has to win once, while Team 2 has to win twice.

Semifinals 

|}

Finals 

|}
Finals MVP: Japeth Aguilar 
Best Player of the Conference: Christian Standhardinger 
Bobby Parks Best Import of the Conference: Allen Durham

Awards

Leo Awards

 Most Valuable Player: June Mar Fajardo (San Miguel)
 Rookie of the Year: CJ Perez (Columbian)
 Most Improved Player: Moala Tautuaa (San Miguel)
 First Mythical Team:
 Jayson Castro (TNT)
 CJ Perez (Columbian)
 June Mar Fajardo (San Miguel)
 Christian Standhardinger (NorthPort)
 Sean Anthony (NorthPort)
 Second Mythical Team:
 Roger Pogoy (TNT)
 Stanley Pringle (Barangay Ginebra)
 Japeth Aguilar (Barangay Ginebra)
 Troy Rosario (TNT)
 Ian Sangalang (Magnolia)
 All-Defensive Team:
 CJ Perez (Columbian)
 Chris Ross (San Miguel)
 June Mar Fajardo (San Miguel)
 Sean Anthony (NorthPort)
 Japeth Aguilar (Barangay Ginebra)
 Samboy Lim Sportsmanship Award: Gabe Norwood (Rain or Shine)

PBA Press Corps Annual Awards
 Defensive Player of the Year: Sean Anthony (NorthPort)
 Scoring Champion: CJ Perez (Columbian)
 Baby Dalupan Coach of the Year: Leo Austria (San Miguel)
 Mr. Quality Minutes: Terrence Romeo (San Miguel)
 Danny Floro Executive of the Year: Ricky Vargas (TNT) 
 Order of Merit: June Mar Fajardo (San Miguel)
All-Rookie Team
 CJ Perez (Columbian)
 Robert Bolick (NorthPort)
 Javee Mocon (Rain or Shine)
 Bobby Ray Parks Jr. (TNT)
 Abu Tratter (Alaska)
All-Interview Team
 Kiefer Ravena (NLEX)
 Christian Standhardinger (NorthPort)
 Beau Belga (Rain or Shine)
 Vic Manuel (Alaska) 
 Arwind Santos (San Miguel)
 Yeng Guiao (NLEX)
 Game of the Season: NorthPort vs. NLEX (November 27, 2019, Governors' Cup quarterfinals)
 President's Cup: Vergel Meneses

PBA teams in Asian club competitions

Cumulative standings

Elimination round

Playoffs

Notes

References

External links
 PBA Official Website

 
PBA